The Democrats are a Greek political party founded in January 2009 in Athens and emblem the olive branch.

The political philosophy of the Democrats, according to the same party, based on the measure and is equally at both ends of the political spectrum reject dogmatism, obsessions and unilateralism.

The Democrats have applied to participate in elections, which was rejected by the Supreme Court and the party participated regularly in the national elections of 2009.

In 2011, participated as co-founders of the party Recreate Greece, whose ballots participated in the elections on May 6, 2012 and 17 June 2012 to 44 candidates, continuing the fraternal relations with the party of Thanos Tzimeros. A few months later Democrats disagreed with Thanos Tzimeros and broke away.

Background and objectives
The Democrats came from open procedures online consultation and dialogue between citizens.

Core objectives
According to the declarations of the party's central objectives are:
 O radical separation of powers
 Eliminating patronage system
 The abolition of nepotism
 The continuous and direct involvement of citizens in governing the country

The main priorities
According to the party, the main priorities are:
 Support of motherhood, women's, youth and family
 Environmental protection and enhancement of public space,
 Minimizing the state's role as an entrepreneur and enhance the supervisory and regulatory role.

Suggested an economic system that promotes healthy entrepreneurship in a context governed by rules and controls combined with a powerful and efficient welfare state. The creation of a model that combines both the development of employment and environmental protection, social cohesion on the other hand with technological progress.

External links
Official site of the party 

2009 establishments in Greece
Political parties established in 2009
Liberal parties in Greece
Centrist parties in Greece